Carmelo Carteri (born July 17, 1956) is a Canadian football player who played professionally for the Saskatchewan Roughriders, Hamilton Tiger-Cats and Montreal Concordes.

References

1956 births
Living people
Canadian football linebackers
Hamilton Tiger-Cats players
Montana Grizzlies football players
Montreal Concordes players
Players of Canadian football from Saskatchewan
Saskatchewan Roughriders players
Sportspeople from Regina, Saskatchewan